Melissa R. Klapper is an American historian and storyteller. She is a professor of American and women's history at Rowan University. Klapper has authored books on the history of children and youth in the United States.

Life 
Klapper completed a B.A. at Goucher College. She earned a Ph.D. from Rutgers University.

Klapper is a historian and storyteller. She is a professor of American and women's history at Rowan University. In 2006, she led the Memories of Migration series at the Haddon Township Branch of the Camden County Library. Klapper specializes in the late 19th and early 20th century. Klapper served as co-chair of the Modern Jewish History, The Americas division of the Association for Jewish Studies. She is the coordinator of the women's and gender studies program at Rowan University. Her 2013 book, Ballots, Babies, and Banners of Peace: American Jewish Women's Activism, 1890-1940, won a National Jewish Book Award in women's studies. She won $24,801 on the March 20, 2023 episode of Jeopardy.

Selected works

See also 

 List of winners of the National Jewish Book Award

References 

Living people
Year of birth missing (living people)
Place of birth missing (living people)
Goucher College alumni
Rutgers University alumni
Rowan University faculty
21st-century American historians
21st-century American women writers
American women historians
Historians of immigration to the United States
Historians of Jews and Judaism